Balankine Nord is a village in the rural commune of Oulampane, in the Bignona Department of the Ziguinchor Region of Senegal. In 2002 it had a population of 631 people.

References

Populated places in the Bignona Department
Arrondissement of Sindian